The 2014 Idaho gubernatorial election was held on November 4, 2014, to elect the Governor of Idaho, concurrently with the election to Idaho's Class II U.S. Senate seat, as well as other elections to the United States Senate in other states and elections to the United States House of Representatives and various state and local elections.

Incumbent Republican Governor Butch Otter ran for election to a third consecutive term in office. In primary elections held on May 20, 2014, Otter was renominated and the Democrats nominated businessman and president of the Boise School District Board of Trustees A.J. Balukoff. Otter defeated Balukoff and four Independent and Third Party challengers in the general election.

Republican primary

Candidates

Declared
 Walt Bayes, perennial candidate
 Harley Brown, candidate for Idaho's 1st congressional district in 2000 and 2010 and candidate for Mayor of Boise in 2001
 Russ Fulcher, state senator
 Butch Otter, incumbent governor

Declined
 Raúl Labrador, U.S. Representative
 Brad Little, Lieutenant Governor of Idaho
 Tom Luna, Idaho Superintendent of Public Instruction
 Rex Rammell, activist, veterinarian and candidate for governor in 2010
 Lawrence Wasden, Attorney General of Idaho

Endorsements

Results

Democratic primary

Candidates

Declared
 A.J. Balukoff, businessman and president of the Boise School District Board of Trustees
 Terry Kerr, former Republican candidate for local office

Declined
 Keith G. Allred, activist, mediator and nominee for governor in 2010
 Cecil D. Andrus, former governor and former United States Secretary of the Interior
 David H. Bieter, Mayor of Boise

Endorsements

Results

Constitution nomination

Candidates

Declared
 Steven Pankey, Republican candidate for lieutenant governor in 2010 and accused murderer

Libertarian nomination

Candidates

Declared
 John Bujak, former Canyon County prosecutor

Independents

Candidates

Declared
 Jill Humble, retired nurse educator and candidate for Boise City Council in 2013
 Pro-Life (formerly known as Marvin Richardson), organic strawberry farmer, anti-abortion activist and perennial candidate

General election

Debates
A debate was held between Balukoff & Bujak. Gov. Otter chose not to participate.
Complete video of debate, September 24, 2014 - C-SPAN

Predictions

Polling

Results

References

External links
 Idaho gubernatorial election, 2014 at Ballotpedia
 Campaign contributions at FollowTheMoney

Official campaign websites (Archived)
 Butch Otter for Governor incumbent
 Russ Fulcher for Governor
 A.J. Balukoff for Governor
 Steve Pankey for Governor
 Pro-Life for Governor

Gubernatorial
2014
2014 United States gubernatorial elections